Blessing Annatoria Chitapa is a Zimbabwe-born singer from Russells Hall, Dudley. She won the ninth series of The Voice UK; her winner's single, a cover version of Robbie Williams' "Angels", charted at number 50 on the UK Singles Download Chart. She attended The Kingswinford School and Dudley College.

Career

2020: The Voice UK 

In 2020, Chitapa auditioned for the ninth series of The Voice UK, and joined Olly Murs' team. After performing "Angels" by Robbie Williams, she was announced as the winner of the series, signing a contract with Island Records.
She has two singles That Love and Stay With Me out

2021: Count My Blessings 

On 2 March 2021, Chitapa announced her new song, "I Smile". The song was released on 12 March 2021, as the lead single from her upcoming debut album, Count My Blessings. She performed the song at the final of the tenth series of The Voice UK.

On 30 April 2021, Annatoria’s debut album Count My Blessings was released.

In 2021, Annatoria parted ways with Island Records.

2022: New music

On 20 March 2022, Annatoria announced her new single "Stay With Me". The song was released on 25 March 2022.

Personal life 
Annatoria is a Christian.

Discography

Studio album

Singles

Promotional singles

References 

 
 

Living people
21st-century Zimbabwean women singers
The Voice (franchise) winners
English Christians
Zimbabwean Christians
2002 births